Innocent Guz (March 18, 1890 in Lemberg, Austria – June 6, 1940; born Joseph Adalbert Guz) was a Polish conventual Franciscan priest who was martyred by a Nazi guard at the Oranienburg-Sachsenhausen concentration camp (Germany), June 6, 1940. He was beatified in 1999 by Pope John Paul II.

Biography
Born under the name of Joseph Adalbert Guz on March 18, 1890 in Lemberg, Austria (present-day Poland), he entered the Franciscans in 1908, where he took the name of Innocent. After studying Philosophy in Krakow, he was ordained a priest in 1914 on the eve of the First World War. He then ministered in various parishes and communities, and then went to Grodno. There he became acquainted with the father Maximilian Kolbe and entered the Mission of the Immaculate, founded by the latter, to become a confessor and professor from 1933 to 1936.

During the occupation of 1939, while the USSR occupied the East and the German Reich the West of Poland, he was transferred to Grodno. He was then arrested and imprisoned on March 21, 1940, by the Soviets who put in place a policy of anti-Christian repression. He escaped and went to the German zone where he was arrested by the Gestapo. He was transferred to Soldau concentration camp and then to Oranienbourg-Sachsenhausen concentration camp. After he arrived at the camp, he was tortured by a guard who killed him on June 6, 1940.

Considered one of the hundred and eight Polish martyrs of the Second World War, he was beatified on June 13, 1999 by Pope John Paul II in Warsaw.

References

External link
Bienheureux Innocent Guz (in French)

1890 births
1940 deaths
20th-century venerated Christians
Franciscan beatified people
Catholic saints and blesseds of the Nazi era
108 Blessed Polish Martyrs
Polish Franciscans